Serdar Yağlı (born 1 January 1978) is a Turkish boxer. He competed in the men's featherweight event at the 1996 Summer Olympics.

References

1978 births
Living people
Turkish male boxers
Olympic boxers of Turkey
Boxers at the 1996 Summer Olympics
Place of birth missing (living people)
Mediterranean Games gold medalists for Turkey
Mediterranean Games medalists in boxing
Competitors at the 1997 Mediterranean Games
Featherweight boxers
20th-century Turkish people